Homalocephala ozerovi is a species of ulidiid or picture-winged fly in the genus Homalocephala of the family Ulidiidae.

References

ozerovi
Insects described in 1998